The LNB Pro A MVP is the MVP award of the top-tier level men's professional club basketball league in France, the LNB Pro A. Maxi-Basket holds the vote, and calls it the referendum.

Player of the Year awards (before 1983)

Before 1983, the title of the best player in the league was sometimes assigned by a panel of journalists, but the charts are incomplete.

Jean Degros (Denain) was voted the best player of the year in the 1962–63 season.
Alain Gilles (ASVEL) was voted the best player of the year in the 1964–65, 1966–67, and 1967–68 seasons.
Michel Le Ray (ABC Nantes) was voted the best player of the year in the 1965–66 season.
Pierre Galle (AS Berck) was voted the best player of the year in the 1972–73 and 1973–74 seasons.

Two awards (1983–2014)
Between 1983 and 2005, the monthly Maxi-Basket conducted a vote of the players and head coaches of the league. Since 2005, the coaches and captains of the LNB Pro A clubs, and a panel of fifty journalists are asked to vote.

Since the 2014–15 LNB Pro A season, the MVP award is a single unified award. Prior to that, it was divided into two separate awards, one for French players, and one for non-French players.

LNB Pro A Unified MVP award (2015–present)

Notes:
 There was no awarding in the 2019–20, because the season was cancelled due to the coronavirus pandemic in Europe.

L'Équipe awards (1994–2005)
Between 1994 and 2005, the French newspaper, L'Équipe, also conducted a selection of the best French and foreign players of the league, through a vote of journalists. These awards are also considered official by the Ligue Nationale de Basket (LNB).

Players with the most French MVPs won by year
French Player's MVP and L'Équipe MVP awards combined. When the player won both awards in the same year, it is counted as a single MVP for the year.

Players with the most Foreign MVPs won by year
Foreign Player's MVP and L'Équipe MVP awards combined. When the player won both awards in the same year, it is counted as a single MVP for the year.

See also
LNB Pro A Finals MVP
LNB Pro A Awards

References

External links
Official Site 

European basketball awards
Basketball most valuable player awards
LNB Pro A awards